Tricolia nordsiecki is a species of sea snail, a marine gastropod mollusk in the family Phasianellidae.

Description
The height of the shell reaches 2 mm.

Distribution
This marine species occurs off the Strait of Gibraltar and the Canary Islands.

References

 Garcia-Talavera, F. (1978). Moluscos marinos de las Islas Salvajes. In: Contribución al estudio de la historia natural de las Islas Salvajes. Aula de Cultura de Tenerife p. 119-128, 1 pl.
 Gofas, S.; Le Renard, J.; Bouchet, P. (2001). Mollusca, in: Costello, M.J. et al. (Ed.) (2001). European register of marine species: a check-list of the marine species in Europe and a bibliography of guides to their identification. Collection Patrimoines Naturels, 50: pp. 180–213
 Gofas S. (1982). The genus Tricolia in the Eastern Atlantic and the Mediterranean. Journal of Molluscan Studies 48: 182-213
 Gofas S. (1982). The genus Tricolia in the Eastern Atlantic and the Mediterranean. Journal of Molluscan Studies 48: 182-213

External links
 

Phasianellidae
Gastropods described in 1978